"Don't Let the Sun Go Down on Me" is a song written by English musician Elton John and songwriter Bernie Taupin. It was originally recorded by John for his eighth studio album, Caribou (1974), and was released as a single that peaked at number two on the Billboard Hot 100 chart, and reached number 16 on the UK Singles Chart.

A version of the song recorded live as a duet between John and George Michael reached number one in the UK in 1991 and in the US in 1992. The pair had performed the song together for the first time at Live Aid at Wembley Stadium in July 1985.

Elton John version

Background
"Don't Let the Sun Go Down on Me" was co-written by Elton John and Bernie Taupin during a ten-day period in January 1974 along with the other songs for John's Caribou album. The song was released as the first single from the album in May 1974 in the United Kingdom, and on 10 June 1974 in the United States.

The chorus of the song is supported with a horn arrangement by Del Newman, and features backing vocals by Carl Wilson and Bruce Johnston of the Beach Boys and Toni Tennille. The original backing vocalists were Cat Stevens, Danny Hutton, Gerry Beckley, Dusty Springfield and Brian Wilson but according to Bruce "everyone was afraid of one another and I couldn't get a performance out of anyone". Also on the song are percussion accents provided by Ray Cooper and a mellotron played by Dave Hentschel.

Reception
Cash Box called it "a gradually building track with pretty lyrics that is as brilliant in performance as it is in production" Record World said that "More poetic than anything he's released since 'Daniel,' this expansive ballad begins simply and builds into a bonanza of bright harmonies."

"Don't Let the Sun Go Down on Me" charted on 1 June 1974 in the UK, reaching number 16 on the UK Singles Chart. The song reached the top 10 on the Billboard Hot 100 chart after four weeks, peaking at number two for two weeks from 27 July behind John Denver's "Annie's Song". In the US, the single was certified Gold on 6 September 1974 by the RIAA. In Canada, it reached number one, becoming his fifth chart topper in that country.

Track listings
 May 1974 US and UK 7" vinyl single
 "Don't Let the Sun Go Down on Me"
 "Sick City"
 February 1991 UK 7" vinyl single and cassette
 "Don't Let the Sun Go Down on Me"
 "Song for Guy"
 February 1991 UK 12" vinyl and CD single
 "Don't Let the Sun Go Down on Me"
 "Song for Guy"
 "Sorry Seems to Be the Hardest Word"

Personnel
 Elton John – piano, organ, vocals
 Davey Johnstone – electric guitar, acoustic guitar
 Dee Murray – bass
 Nigel Olsson – drums
 Ray Cooper – tambourine, bells
 David Hentschel – mellotron
 Carl Wilson – backing vocals
 Bruce Johnston – backing vocals
 Billy Hinsche – backing vocals
 Toni Tennille – backing vocals
 Vocals arranged by Bruce Johnston with help from The Captain
 Horns arranged by Del Newman

Accolades

Grammy Awards

|-
|  style="width:35px; text-align:center;" rowspan="2"|1975 || rowspan="2"| "Don't Let the Sun Go Down on Me" || Record of the Year || 
|-
| Best Pop Vocal Performance – Male || 
|-

Charts and certifications

Weekly charts

Year-end charts

Certifications

1986–1987 live version
Elton John recorded a live version on 14 December 1986 that appears on the Live in Australia with the Melbourne Symphony Orchestra album. In his 2019 autobiography, Me, Elton claims that this performance is special because he thought it was the last time he was ever going to sing. The singer was going in to dangerous throat surgery a few days later. An edited version of this same recording was released as a single in 1987 and also appears in the To Be Continued... box set.

1990 MTV Unplugged
On 17 May 1990, Elton John recorded a performance on MTV Unplugged at the Chelsea Studios in New York City. An acoustic version of the song was included as a track on The Unplugged Collection, Volume One.

George Michael and Elton John version

Background
In 1991, "Don't Let the Sun Go Down on Me" was covered in a live version as a duet by George Michael and Elton John. The pair had first performed the song at the Live Aid concert in 1985 (with Michael singing and John playing, featuring backup vocals by Wham! partner Andrew Ridgeley and Kiki Dee). Six years later, George Michael's Cover to Cover tour regularly included the song, and for the final show at Wembley Arena, London on 23 March 1991, Michael brought out John as a surprise guest to sing it with him.

Reception
Released as a single later that year, the song reached number one on both sides of the Atlantic, spending two weeks at number one on the UK Singles Chart in December 1991 and one week on the Billboard Hot 100 chart dated 1 February 1992. The duet also spent two weeks at number one on the Adult Contemporary chart.

This version of the song was also nominated for a Grammy Award for Best Pop Vocal Performance by a Duo or Group with Vocal.

It appears on John's Love Songs and Greatest Hits 1970–2002 compilations, as well as his 1993 Duets album. The proceeds from the single were divided among 10 charities for children, AIDS and education.

Music video
The footage used for the single's music video (directed by Andy Morahan) was taken from a "live" concert in Chicago with 70,000 fans. "The video was actually shot over several days," confirms Michael Pagnotta, George's publicist. "It was shot in an airline hangar in Burbank, California where George had been rehearsing; Elton came in for a night and they ran through the song a couple of times. Then the song was filmed in its entirety live in Chicago in the middle of October as part of that Cover to Cover tour, and when Elton came out from the wings, that place went crazy."

Track listings
 US and UK 7" vinyl and cassette single
 "Don't Let the Sun Go Down on Me" 
 "I Believe (When I Fall in Love It Will Be Forever)" 

 US and UK 12" vinyl single
 "Don't Let the Sun Go Down on Me" 
 "I Believe (When I Fall in Love It Will Be Forever)" 
 "Last Christmas" 

 UK and Europe compact disc single (Epic 657656)
 "Don't Let the Sun Go Down on Me" 
 "I Believe (When I Fall in Love It Will Be Forever)" 
 "If You Were My Woman" 
 "Fantasy"

 US compact disc single (Columbia 44K-74240)
 "Don't Let the Sun Go Down on Me" 
 "I Believe (When I Fall in Love It Will Be Forever)" 
 "Freedom" (Back to Reality Mix)
 "If You Were My Woman" 

All b-sides and additional tracks were performed solo by George Michael, except Last Christmas which is performed by Michael's duo Wham!The live version of "I Believe (When I Fall in Love It Will Be Forever)" had previously been issued as the lead track on a free promotional cassette given away at Michael's Wembley Arena gigs in March 1991.  Therefore, it is likely to have been recorded at a venue earlier in the tour.

Charts

Weekly charts

Year-end charts

Decade-end charts

Certifications

Other notable versions
 Jazz singer Oleta Adams recorded a cover version for the 1991 tribute album Two Rooms: Celebrating the Songs of Elton John & Bernie Taupin. It was released as a single and peaked at number 33 in the UK and at number 32 in the Netherlands.

References

External links
 

1970s ballads
1974 singles
1974 songs
1991 singles
1992 singles
The Beach Boys songs
Billboard Hot 100 number-one singles
Cashbox number-one singles
Columbia Records singles
David Archuleta songs
DJM Records singles
Dutch Top 40 number-one singles
Elton John songs
Epic Records singles
European Hot 100 Singles number-one singles
George Michael songs
MCA Records singles
Music videos directed by Andy Morahan
Number-one singles in Belgium
Number-one singles in Greece
Number-one singles in Italy
Number-one singles in Norway
Number-one singles in Portugal
Number-one singles in Switzerland
Phonogram Records singles
The Rocket Record Company singles
RPM Top Singles number-one singles
SNEP Top Singles number-one singles
Song recordings produced by Gus Dudgeon
Song recordings produced by George Michael
Songs with lyrics by Bernie Taupin
Songs with music by Elton John
UK Singles Chart number-one singles
Male vocal duets